Joe Bob Isbell (born July 7, 1940) is a former American football offensive guard in the National Football League for the Dallas Cowboys and Cleveland Browns. He played college football at the University of Houston.

Early years
Isbell attended Little Cypress High School, before moving on to the University of Houston, where he was a team co-captain as a senior.

Professional career

Dallas Cowboys
Isbell was selected by the Houston Oilers in the twentieth round (159th overall) of the 1962 AFL Draft, but instead chose to sign with the NFL's Dallas Cowboys as a free agent in 1962. On September 11, he was placed on the injured reserve list, but returned in October to play in 9 games.

On November 3, 1963, he suffered a left knee injury against the Washington Redskins and was lost for the year.

Isbell was mostly a backup player until 1964, when he started 10 games at right guard. The next year, he was placed on the taxi squad because of injuries and wasn't activated during the season.

On August 15, 1966, he was traded to the Cleveland Browns in exchange for a fifth round draft choice (#127-Zeke Moore).

Cleveland Browns
In 1966, he was a reserve player with the Cleveland Browns. He was waived on September 5, 1967.

Houston Oilers
In 1967, he was signed as a free agent by the Houston Oilers to their taxi squad.

Cincinnati Bengals
Isbell was selected by the Cincinnati Bengals in the 1968 AFL expansion draft from the Houston Oilers roster. He was released on July 13.

Personal life
He was born to Earl Palmer Isbell and Beulah J. Alexander Isbell. He is a distant cousin to professional football players and fellow Texans Cecil Isbell and Larry Isbell. Has 2 granddaughters and 1 grandson.

References 

1940 births
Living people
People from Orange, Texas
Players of American football from Texas
American football offensive guards
Houston Cougars football players
Dallas Cowboys players
Cleveland Browns players
Houston Oilers players
People from Gorman, Texas